15th Central Committee may refer to:
Central Committee of the 15th Congress of the All-Union Communist Party (Bolsheviks), 1927–1930
15th Central Committee of the Chinese Communist Party, 1997–2002